Cross-gender acting refers to actors or actresses portraying a character of the opposite sex. It is distinct from both transgender and cross-dressing character roles.

Traditions of male-only performance cultures
Many societies prohibited women from performing on stage, so boys and men took the female roles. In the ancient Greek theatre men played females, as they did in English Renaissance theatre and continue to do in Japanese kabuki theatre (see onnagata).  In Chinese opera specialized male actors who play female roles (dàn) are referred to as nándàn (男旦); the practice arose during the Qing dynasty due to imperial prohibitions against women performing on stage, considered detrimental to public morality.

Japanese kabuki theatre began in the 17th century with all-female troupes performing both male and female roles. In 1629 the disrepute of kabuki performances (or of their audiences) led to the banning of women from the stage, but kabuki's great popularity inspired the formation of all-male troupes to carry on the theatrical genre. In kabuki, the portrayal of female characters by men is known as onnagata. The practice is detailed in a story of the same name by the Japanese writer, Yukio Mishima. All roles in Noh dramas are traditionally played by male actors; actors playing female roles wear feminine costumes and female-featured masks. The Takarazuka Revue is a contemporary all-female Japanese acting company, known for their elaborate productions of stage musicals. Takarazuka was created in the early 20th century by Ichizō Kobayashi Takarazuka actresses specialize in either male roles (otokoyaku) or female roles (musumeyaku), with male-role actresses receiving top billing. In contrast to kabuki's exclusion of female performers, Takarazuka introduced a theatrical performance platform where women could take the stage. However, despite this opportunity for women to embody roles that represented their sex, as well as a man's, the structure of Takarazuka still reflected the patriarchal control of Japan. The musumeyaku represented fictional recreations of women. As for the otokoyaku, their roles aimed to emulate a model man that women would desire. Jennifer Robertson asserts, “Personal or contrary motivations and desires aside, both musumeyaku and otokoyaku are the products of a masculinist imagination in their official stage roles”.

Nearly all the characters in Chinese Opera were performed by men; they cross-dressed to play the roles of women. A famous cross-dressing opera singer is Mei Lanfang. From the early 20th century, Yue opera is developed from all male to all female genre. Although male performers were introduced into this opera in the 1950s and 1960s, today, Yue opera is still associated as the only all female opera and the second most popular opera in China.

In Renaissance England, women were forbidden from performing on stage, so female roles in the plays of Shakespeare and his contemporary playwrights were originally played by cross-dressing men or boys. (See also Stage Beauty.) Therefore, the original productions of the above-mentioned Shakespeare plays actually involved double-cross-dressing: male actors playing female characters disguising themselves as males. Academic research into the contemporary attitudes towards the practise have yielded a variety of interpretations. Historian Laura Levine argues that "an all-male acting troupe was the natural and unremarkable product of a culture whose conception of gender was "teleologically male".

Women as men

Cross-dressing in sixteenth- and seventeenth-century Spain was frequent among actors, and the theater was at the time the most popular form of entertainment. There was a fascination with female cross-dressers particularly (women dressed as men), who were "extremely popular" in the "Golden Age Comedia". Male actors might play the "women dressed as men" parts. Spain eventually found this cross-dressing to be threatening to social order, and passed laws targeting female transvestites throughout the 1600s. Despite the negative reactions and disapproval, it continued to remain very popular in the comedia.

In contrast to women playing men and vice versa in Spain's comedia, Japan's Takarazuka Revue Company only had female performers for both their male and female roles. Amongst the Takarasiennes, the musumeyaku and otokoyaku role distributions were determined after they graduated from the Takarazuka Music School (Takarazuka Ongaku Gakkō). The musumeyaku and otokoyaku positions of the performers were determined through an evaluation of the performers’ appearance and behavioral performance ability of a female or male. In this assessment, facial and body signifiers (e.g. jaw structure, eyebrows, height, shoulder span) were taken into consideration to determine what females would be fit for the positions. Additionally, behavioral test runs examined the voice, mannerism, and overall persona of the performers.

Theatre, operas, plays, ballets and pantomime 

A travesti is a theatrical term referring to the portrayal of a character in an opera, play, or ballet by a performer of the opposite sex. More specifically, a theatrical or operatic role in which an actress appears in male clothing is called a "breeches role" ("pants role" or "trouser role"), and roles once performed by a male soprano castrato may instead be performed by a female mezzo-soprano or contralto.

In the late 19th century, one of the most famous actresses was Vesta Tilley, who worked in a music hall from age five well into her fifties. In the late 1890s, she was the highest paid woman in Britain. What made her so famous was her tendency to dress as a man and act out "masculine" scenes and roles. Centuries before, Julie d'Aubigny, aka "La Maupin" (1670–1707), had also been famous for her breeches roles.

In 1904, Nina Boucicault originated the theatrical tradition of cross-sex casting for Peter Pan, continued thereafter by Maude Adams, Marilyn Miller, Eva Le Gallienne, Sandy Duncan, and Cathy Rigby, among others. In 1954 Mary Martin portrayed the title character in the musical Peter Pan. "The boy who would never grow up" is a classic trouser role, as is Cherubino in The Marriage of Figaro (by Beaumarchais).

In pantomime plays that are traditionally adaptations of fairy tales and performed around Christmastide, the role of lead male was once commonly played by a principal boy—a young, attractive, female. This practise has fallen out of favour recently, with popular male television and pop stars taking these roles. Conversely, the role of a pantomime dame, a middle aged woman played by a man in drag for comic relief, is still one of the mainstays of panto.

Similarly, Georgy Millyar played a role of Baba Yaga, an ugly old woman with supernatural abilities in a dozen of films, including Vasilisa the Beautiful (1940) and Jack Frost (1964). He used to say that an actress does not ever allow anyone to make her that ugly, while he does.

Renaissance cross-gender acting

Gender distinction and cross-gender acting 
Cross-gender acting, while not specifically making a statement about crossdressing, helped produce negative judgements and statements about those who did cross-dress in the Renaissance era. In order to maintain a hierarchy between genders, something that was prominent in the Renaissance era, there needed to be two genders that were distinct from one another, where an obvious gap in the work sphere could be identified and followed as a result of this gender distinction. Cross-gender acting disrupted gender distinction, as it was either viewed as shameful for MTF (male-to-female) acting to occur or it would give the male actor added benefits of wealth and social standing in scenarios where men would dress as females who married well-off men. It also allowed females a momentary hierarchy, putting them on equal footing to men when they played the roles of male characters. In instances where boys acted as women, it was because they were seen as objects of desire, much like women, and they were also in a subordinate position in the hierarchy scale.

Desire, homosexuality, and the malleability of gender for Renaissance MTF and boy actors 
In order to correctly portray the essence of a female when acting, male actors needed to get the audience to believe that they were females, and to do this, MTF actors needed the audience to desire them. Once male actors stepped into roles of women, it was feared that they would then begin to act like the typical unreasonable female identity which made it appear as though crossdressing was an undisciplined act. While troubling to some, the idea of crossdressing interlaced in MTF acting proved that gender was malleable when it came to England in the Renaissance Era. Through cross-gender acting, it has been proposed that gender is something that is changeable for anyone who desires to be of another gender at any time. It was also believed that the theater was a safe space for crossdressing to occur because it confined the act to a distinct place.

When boy actors were used to portray female characters, it was feared by those who were religious that the boys would become the women they embodied in the plays, and therefore they would transform into objects of erotic thoughts for male spectators, further turning the spectators into homosexuals. This sense of desire came from a failed attempt to represent gender category when cross-gender acting occurred. The female costume intermixed with the boy actors' bodies created a sense of confusion between knowledge and visibility and it was thought that this confusion forced male spectators to translate women's appearances to the bodies of boys. Many times Shakespeare has been criticized for inciting male spectator desire on boy-to-female characters in his plays such as As You Like It where boys played highly sexualized female characters.

Modern practices of cross-gender acting
In animations and video games, it is not unusual for female actors to voice young male characters. Notable examples are Nancy Cartwright voicing Bart Simpson in The Simpsons and Junko Takeuchi voicing Naruto Uzumaki in the anime series Naruto. Voice actress Tara Strong has voiced multiple young male characters such as Timmy Turner and Ben Tennyson. Instances of male actors voicing female characters have also occurred, including Bob Peterson as Roz in Monsters, Inc. and Brad Bird as Edna Mode in the Incredibles franchise.

In musical theatre, some characters have become synonymous with cross-sex acting. The musical Hairspray frequently sees a male actor portraying the female role of Edna Turnblad.

When the casting director of a production decides to employ cross-sex acting, selecting the actors in this way is sometimes also called "cross-sex casting" or simply "cross-casting".

Film and television examples 
see also Cross-dressing in film and television (mainly listing characters cross-dressing in the frame of a story, rather than actors cross-dressing to portray a role of the opposite sex)

Meta examples 
Tootsie (1982) - The character Michael Dorsey (portrayed by Dustin Hoffman) star as Dorothy Michaels in the show-within-show soap opera Southwest General
Victor/Victoria (1982) - The character Victoria Grant (portrayed by Julie Andrews) pretends to be Count Victor Grezinski and finds work as a female impersonator.
Flickan vid stenbänken (1989) - The character Carolin (Anna Edlund) briefly portrays a man in a (show-within-show) play.
Shakespeare in Love (1998) - The character Viola de Lesseps (portrayed by Gwyneth Paltrow) disguises herself as Thomas Kent and then plays the part of Juliet in the show-within-show Romeo and Juliet.
Mrs. Doubtfire (1993) - The character Daniel Hillard (Robin Williams) dresses as nanny Mrs. Doubtfire and is hired to host a children's show.
High School Musical: The Musical: The Series (2019–present) - The character Seb (Joe Serafini) plays the part of Sharpay Evans in the school production of High School Musical.

Video Game examples 
New Super Mario Bros. Wii (2009) - A few Koopalings, including Larry, Lemmy and Morton were voiced by Lani Minella.
Danganronpa: Trigger Happy Havoc (2010) - For the JP version, Makoto Naegi was portrayed by Megumi Ogata. In the English version, Chihiro Fujsaki was voiced by Dorothy Fahn and for the Japanese version, His VA was Kōki Miyata.
Danganronpa 2: Goodbye Despair (2012) - Hajime Hinata was voiced by Minami Takayama while Nagito Komaeda was voiced by Makoto's VA; Megumi Ogata.
Kid Icarus: Uprising (2012) - Pit was portrayed by Minami Takayama, who majorly voiced as him for the Super Smash Bros. series.
Danganronpa V3: Killing Harmony (2017) - Female Seiyuu Megumi Hayashibara voiced as the Ultimate Deceive; Shuichi Saihara, while Kōichi Yamadera voiced as the only female Monokub; Monophanie along with the rest of the kubs.

Gender-sex politics in cross-gender acting 
Within Japan's Takarazuka Revue Company, their most notable feature, besides their show-stopping extravagant productions, is the role of their otokoyaku character. This is the popular male character played by trained female performers that specialize in exuding the dreamy, heroic, and graceful man of women's dreams. To further explain the role of the otokoyaku ‘male’ character, Lorie Brau contends that, "The otokoyaku does not represent a 'nama no otoko', that is to say, a 'man in the raw', but an idealized, 'beautiful' man-a man without dirt, sweat, roughness, and a need to dominate. The otokoyaku's female following see her as a version of this kind of androgynous, safe beauty rarely found in real men". Therefore, while the otokoyaku presents a male guise that is the “risoteki na dansei” (ideal man) women are attracted to, the otokoyaku also creates an admirable attraction from female fans because they embrace a type of androgynous freedom and non-constrained continuum of gender. As female performers, fans see women breaking the confines of societal female expectations, as well as embracing the femme side of the male-masculine image. However, despite this progressive multi-dimensional role of the otokoyaku, the reality of how far these interpretations could be expressed by the actual female performers was quite the opposite.

With the creation of the Takarazuka Revue Company, Ichizō Kobayashi intended to use the troupe to reinforce the patriarchal status quo of Japan by training his female performers how to be obedient women and “good wives and wise mothers”. Despite the non-conventional female position as the otokoyaku, this too played into patriarchal ideologies. Jennifer Robertson mentions, “Kobayashi theorized that by performing as men, females learned to understand and appreciate males and the masculine psyche”.

See also
Cross-dressing in film and television
Cross-dressing in literature
Köçek, a Turkish term for a young male entertainer dressed as a young woman
List of transgender-related topics
List of transgender characters in film and television

References

Acting
Gender nonconformity
Cross-dressing-related mass media